The 1922 Penn Quakers football team was an American football team that represented the University of Pennsylvania as an independent during the 1922 college football season. In their third and final season under head coach John Heisman, the Quakers compiled a 6–3 record and outscored all opponents by a total of 100 to 44. The team played its home games at Franklin Field in Philadelphia.

Schedule

References

Penn
Penn Quakers football seasons
Penn Quakers football